Marcel Foucault (1865–1947) was a French philosopher and psychologist.

Marcel Foucault was professor of philosophy at the University of Montpellier. In 1906 he founded a laboratory of experimental psychology at the university.

Works
Ls psycho-physique, F. Alcan, 1901
Observations et experiences de Psychologie scolaire, 1910
L'illusion paradoxale et le seuil de Weber, Montpellier: Coulet et fils, 1910
Cours de psychologie, F. Alcan, 1926

References

1865 births
1947 deaths
French psychologists
French philosophers
Academic staff of the University of Montpellier
French male non-fiction writers